Boris Andreyevich Lavrenyov (real name Sergeyev), born July 4 (18), 1891 in Kherson, died January 7, 1959 in Moscow, was a Soviet Russian writer and playwright.

Lavrenyov was born to the family of a literature teacher.  He got his education at the Law department of the Moscow University.  At the time he wrote poetry and joined a Moscow Futurists group called Mezonin poezii (A Mezzanine of Poetry).  He fought in World War I and the Russian Civil War.  During the latter he took part in combat in Turkmenistan, served as a commander of an armoured train, and also wrote for the Red Army military newspaper.  His poetry was first published in 1911 and his prose works in 1924.  He was twice awarded the Stalin Prize – in 1946 and 1950.

Lavrenyov's story "Sorok pervyi" ("The Forty-First", first published in Zvezda in 1924) was twice adapted to film, in 1927 by Yakov Protazanov and in 1956 by Grigori Chukhrai.

English translations
The Forty-First, Foreign Languages Publishing House, 1926. English summary from Sovlit.net
Such a Simple Thing, from Such a Simple Thing and Other Soviet Stories, Foreign Languages Publishing House, 1959. from Archive.org
The Courageous Heart, Progress Publishers, 1978.
The Heavenly Cap, from The Fatal Eggs and Other Soviet Satire, Grove Press, 1994.

References

See also
The Seventh Companion

1891 births
1953 deaths
Russian male novelists
Russian male short story writers
Soviet novelists
Soviet male writers
20th-century male writers
Military personnel from Kherson
Imperial Moscow University alumni
Russian dramatists and playwrights
Russian male dramatists and playwrights
Soviet dramatists and playwrights
Soviet short story writers
20th-century Russian short story writers
Russian military personnel of World War I
People of the Russian Civil War
Stalin Prize winners
Writers from Kherson
Soviet magazine editors